Evangelina Vigil-Piñón is a Chicana poet, children's book author, director, translator, and television personality.

Life
Her mother's family emigrated to Texas in the early 1900s from Parras, Mexico. As a child, Vigil-Piñón lived with her maternal grandmother.  Her interest in literature started since she was a little girl.  As a sixth grader, her principal sent her to the Inman Christian Center, a private art school in San Antonio, where she was in attendance with people in their twenties. Vigil-Piñón earned a scholarship for business administration and started school at Prairie View A&M University.
She graduated from University of Houston. 
She studied at St. Mary's University, and University of Texas at San Antonio.
She was assistant editor of Americas Review.
She teaches Mexican American and U.S. Hispanic literature as an adjunct lecturer at University of Houston. She currently is a television journalist extensively involved in community affairs with ABC-KTRK TV Channel 13 in Houston, Texas.  Married Mark Anthony Piñón in 1983; they had a son, Marc-Antony Piñón, in 1984.

Awards
 1983 American Book Award
 National Endowment for the Arts Fellow

Works
 Nade y Nade, M&A Editions, 1978

Editor

Translator

Anthologies

Further reading
Art at Our Doorstep: San Antonio Writers and Artists featuring Evangelina Vigil-Piñón. Edited by Nan Cuba and Riley Robinson (Trinity University Press, 2008).

References

1949 births
People from Houston
People from San Antonio
University of Houston faculty
Living people
American women poets
American Book Award winners
American writers of Mexican descent
American women academics
21st-century American women